Civil contract may refer to:
 Contract, a promise enforced by civil law
 Civil Contract (Armenia), a political party
 Civil union, a legally recognized relationship similar to marriage

See also 
 A Civil Contract, a novel by Georgette Heyer